MXU may refer to:

 Mullewa Airport (IATA code), Australia
 Media Extension Unit, a SIMD extension for the MIPS computer architecture